Aarubote  is a village development committee in Panchthar District in the Province No. 1 of eastern Nepal. At the time of the 1991 Nepal census it had a population of 3482 people living in 652 individual households.

List of villages
Pekuwa
 Kerabari
 Mahepa
 Aahale
 Bajhagara
 Gairigaun
 Naagi
 Dhode

References

Populated places in Panchthar District